The Journal of International Development is the official peer-reviewed academic journal of the Development Studies Association. It publishes research on international development issues with its main focus on the social sciences (economics, politics, international relations, sociology, and anthropology) as well as development studies, although it also publishes work that involves both the natural and social sciences.

References

External links 
 

Publications established in 1989
Development studies journals
English-language journals
Wiley (publisher) academic journals
International relations journals
8 times per year journals